Abu Sayeed is a politician from Pabna district of Bangladesh, organizer of the War of Liberation, and former Minister of State for Information who was a Member of Parliament for the then Pabna 8 and Pabna-1 constituencies.

Career
Sayeed was a member of the then Pakistan National Assembly in 1970. He was part of the 34-member committee formed in 1972 to formulate the draft Constitution of Bangladesh. He was designated as the governor of Pabna district by Sheikh Mujibur Rahman in 1975. He has been known for his criticism of the military government.

Sayeed was the State Minister of Information of Bangladesh from 6 June 1996 until 15 July 2001.

In 2013, Sayeed was conferred a PhD degree by Rajshahi University for his thesis titled "Independence of Bangladesh: Diplomatic War".

In January 2014, Sayeed lost as an independent candidate to Shamsul Haque Tuku in the general election from Pabna-1 constituency.

In November 2018, Sayeed left Awami League and joined Gano Forum to contest the upcoming election from Pabna-1 as a candidate of the Jatiya Oikya Front.

References

Living people
Awami League politicians
Academic staff of the University of Rajshahi
State Ministers of Information (Bangladesh)
Place of birth missing (living people)
Date of birth missing (living people)
Year of birth missing (living people)
Pabna Edward College alumni
Bangladesh Krishak Sramik Awami League central committee members